Banchette Castle ( is a castle located in Banchette, Piedmont, Italy.

History 
The castle already existed in the 12th century. It was originally built as a fortified house upon ancient Roman vestiges by the Di Banchette family.

At the end of the 19th century, Emilio Pinchia, owner of the property at that time, commissioned Ottavio Germano to renovate the castle. Germano had previously worked as collaborator of the more famous architect Alfredo d'Andrade.

Gallery

References

External links

Official Website——

Castles in Piedmont